The 1876 West Virginia gubernatorial election took place on October 10, 1876, to elect the governor of West Virginia.

Results

References

1876
gubernatorial
West Virginia
October 1876 events